Marek Nikl (born 20 February 1976) is a Czech former professional footballer who played as a centre back, most notably for 1. FC Nürnberg. He made five appearances for the Czech Republic national team.

Career
Nikl spent most of his early footballing years with Prague-based club Bohemians – with a short spell at Sparta Krc in the 1994–95 season – before joining then newly promoted Bundesliga side 1. FC Nürnberg in November 1998 for the remainder of the 1998–99 season. He played in all 22 games after his arrival in Franconia but could not prevent the side going down despite scoring his first goal for the Club in the final game of the season.  This game saw Nürnberg dropping from a secure 12th spot going into the match to being relegated on scored goals as 16th of the league at the end of the match.

Nikl stayed with the team and was a cornerstone in the following two seasons.  Nürnberg were promoted again at the end of the 2000–01 season and successfully staved off relegation in the following season, with the Czech defender again playing a vital role in doing so.  However, the team could not accomplish the feat a second time and were relegated again at the end of the 2002–03 season. Nikl still played in most of the games for the team and was well established within the team's hierarchy.  He chose not to leave the club and stayed on to help the team get promoted for a third time during his spell at Nürnberg.

Once more, Nikl proved a valuable asset during the successful promotion campaign the following season missing merely six of thirty-four games. Nürnberg stayed up the next year and Nikl played in 25 matches, twice missing three matches in a row due to injuries.  With the beginning of the 2005–06 season, Nikl seemed to fall out of coach Wolfgang Wolf's favor playing just five of the eleven games until Wolf's dismissal.  With the arrival of new coach Hans Meyer, Nikl was back in the starting line-up playing all of the remaining twenty-two matches stabilising Nürnberg's defence in the process.

Troubled by minor injuries and problems with his stamina, Nikl was forced to sit out the start of the following 2006–07 season coming on in only seven games. Nevertheless, he was part of the squad that won the national cup in May 2007.

In the following season, Nikl played several matches for the second team squad in the German fourth division. Because of the unsatisfying situation he left the FCN in September 2007 and again joined Bohemians 1905 Prague.

He was capped five times for the Czech Republic national team and all of these caps were gained while playing at Nürnberg. His debut was against Poland on 28 April 1999, his last game thus far came against Slovenia in August 2000.

Honours
1. FC Nürnberg
DFB-Pokal: 2006–07

External links
 
 Marek Nikl at FCN website 
 

1976 births
Living people
People from Nymburk
Czech footballers
Association football defenders
Czech Republic international footballers
SK Sparta Krč players
Bohemians 1905 players
1. FC Nürnberg players
Bundesliga players
2. Bundesliga players
Czech First League players
Czech expatriate footballers
Czech expatriate sportspeople in Germany
Expatriate footballers in Germany
Sportspeople from the Central Bohemian Region